Arnette Lamb (January 12, 1947 – September 18, 1998) was an American author of romance novels.

Bibliography

MacKenzie Series
Threads of Destiny	1990/Jul
Highland Rogue	1991/Jul
Betrayed	1995/Nov
Beguiled	1996/Jun
True Heart	1997/Jan

Single novels
The Betrothal	1992/Jun
His Flame	1998/Dec

Border Series
Border Lord	1993/Fec
Border Bride	1993/Sep
Chieftain	1994/Apr
Maiden of Inverness	1995/Mar

Anthologies in collaboration
"Flowers from the Sea" in Cherished Moments (with Rosanne Bittner and Anita Mills) 1994,05
"Hark! The Herald" in A Holiday of Love (with Jill Barnett, Jude Deveraux and Judith McNaught)  1994,11

Reference and sources

Arnette Lamb in Fantastic Fiction

See also

List of romantic novelists

1947 births
1998 deaths
American romantic fiction writers
American women novelists
Women romantic fiction writers
20th-century American novelists
20th-century American women writers